Chetoneura is a genus of flies belonging to the family Keroplatidae.

Species:

Chetoneura cavernae 
Chetoneura shennonggongensis

References

Keroplatidae